Washing is a method of cleaning.

Washing may also refer to:
 Check washing, the process of erasing details from checks to allow them to be rewritten
 Greenwashing, a form of marketing spin about environmental friendliness
 Washing (photography), an important part of all film processing and printmaking processes
 Whitewashing (censorship), a metaphor about covering over errors or bad actions

See also 
 Laundering (disambiguation)